Mohamed Habib Marzouki (also, Abu Yaareb al-Marzouki and Abou Yaareb al-Marzouki; born 29 March 1947) is a Tunisian academic, philosopher and translator. Along with intellectual work, he involved in politics for a short time following the Jasmine revolution. Resigning only a year later, he declared his intention to step out of political work for good and count on writing to incite social change.

A central theme of Marzouki's thought is reconciling, or even unifying, philosophy and religion. According to him, ending the conflict between philosophy and religion (or Islam in particular), which he believes is an ancient one, is the only possible way to bring about actual reform in the Islamic world in particular, and the world in general. To achieve the "civilizational revival of the Islamic nation, he argues, Muslim nations must overcome the ideas of Arabic Renaissance so that they can resume what he calls their current civilizational mission in the context of globalization, holding that "without strong and independent economies and serious ethics of work, social growth may remain a wishful thinking".

Early life and education
He was born in Ferryville, French Protectorate of Tunisia. The thirteenth in a family of fifteen children, he obtained a philosophy degree at the Sorbonne University in 1972. He taught at the University of Tunis between 1980 and 2006 and at the International Islamic University of Malaysia.

Political career
He was elected to the Constituent Assembly as a representative of the Islamist party Ennahda for the district of Tunis on 23 October 2011, and was subsequently appointed advisor, with cabinet rank, to the Culture and the Education ministers. He later resigned from the assembly on 6 March 2013, and returned to teaching philosophy. Upon retirement, he left a bitter note to conclude his experience in which he accused Ennahda, then-governing party, of nepotism and exploiting power as if it were a "spoil of war".

Bibliography

Own works

Co-authored

Translations

from German
 This translation was winner of Sheikh Zayed Book Award in 2012.
Lectures on the Philosophy of Religion, published in two volumes:

from English

from French

References

Further reading
 Allocates an appendix to refute Abu Yaareb's criticism of Aristotelian logic as per the latter's interpretation of Ibn Taymiyyah.

External links 

1947 births
Living people
Tunisian Muslims
People from Bizerte Governorate
Tunisian philosophers
Academic staff of Tunis University
Ennahda politicians
Members of the Constituent Assembly of Tunisia
Academic staff of the International Islamic University Malaysia